Erich Hasenkopf (20 February 1935 – 12 July 2021) was an Austrian football defender who played for Austria in the 1960 European Nations' Cup. He also played for Wiener Sport-Club.

References

1935 births
2021 deaths
Austrian footballers
Austria international footballers
Association football defenders
Wiener Sport-Club players